Boxeur Des Rues is an Italian streetwear and sportswear brand founded in 2003 owned by Boxeur Des Rues & Malloy S.r.l. a company based in Segrate, Italy. The company is active in design, manufacturing, licensing and marketing of fashion and sports clothing and goods, such as shoes and accessories.

History 
Boxeur Des Rues literally means "street fighting boxer". The brand is inspired by the world of Savate, the French boxing born by the fusion of traditional western boxing techniques and oriental Martial arts, that was learned by French sailors returning from the various ports of Far East and Southeast Asia at the beginning of the 19th century. Subsequently, these techniques merged with each other, evolving and beginning to be used in frequent street raids. Later in Marseille, the most important and toughest European port, numerous illegal combat circles (the "Fight Clubs") were born with a large round of betting around them. From here the name "Boxeur Des Rues": true sportsmen, born and raised on the streets. The brand is actually an expression of the fusion of "streetwear" and "sportswear".

In 2012, the company employed 195 people and reported revenues of €25 million.  Boxeur Des Rues competes in the global market with other popular brands such as Nike, Adidas, Superdry.

Distribution 
While 80% of revenues come from Italy, Boxeur Des Rues has a strong product distribution network around the world with many stores in relevant countries:
 Austria
 Netherlands
 Spain
 Switzerland
 France
 Germany
 Moldova
 Slovenia
 Croatia
 Latvia
 Malta
 Montenegro
 Belgium
 Luxembourg
 Czech Republic
 Greece
 Ukraine
 Finland
 Sweden
 Russia
 China
 Hong Kong
 Taiwan

Sponsorship 
Since 2007 Boxeur Des Rues ® has been partner and technical supplier of several sport teams and organisations. I had several testimonials, including three olympic champions: Clemente Russo, Vincenzo Mangiacapre e Irma Testa.

Motorsport 
 Pramac Racing Ducati (2007 – 2012, 2017 – today)
 ISPA KTM (2008)
 ONDE 2000 KTM (2007)
 Leopard Racing (2016 – today)

Combat sport 
 Bellator (2017)
 Federazione Pugilistica Italiana (2012–2017)
 Italia Thunder (World Series of Boxing)
 Oktagon (2012–2017)
 Thaiboxe Mania (2017)

Cycle sport 
 Giro d'Italia (2016)

Football

Basketball
 Pallacanestro Crema (2019–)

In media 
In 2015, in Italy, Boxeur Des Rues was the sponsor of various movies such as "Southpaw – The Challenge", distributed in collaboration with 01Distribution, and of "Creed – Born to Fight", in collaboration with Warner Bros. In 2016 he is also the sponsor of "Bleed for This".

References

External links 
Boxeur Des Rues bets in Made in Italy
 Kick Boxing, il cirotano Cataldo Amodeo e’ vice campione italiano
 PREMI-Sport Marketing Award: ecco i premi di Assosport
 Libri e Boxe: Un Mike Tyson inedito nelle pagine del libro di De Franco
http://www.calcioefinanza.it/2017/06/29/cittadella-boxeur-des-reus-sponsor/
http://www.valdichianaoutlet.it/it/shop-and-brands/boxeur-des-rues-malloy

Clothing brands of Italy
Manufacturing companies based in Milan
Sportswear brands